Cheri Merritt Barry is an American politician and former mayor of Meridian, Mississippi. She is the first woman to hold that position.

Biography
Cheri Merritt grew up in Meridian, where she was a graduate of Lamar High School in 1973.  She continued her education at the University of Mississippi, where she graduated in 1977.

Shortly after graduation, she married Rick Barry, who is a County Attorney.  They have three children, Jennifer Barry Fowler, Jay Barry and Merritt Barry.

Cheri Barry has spent a good part of her professional career in public service.  It began with the Lafayette County welfare system, where her focus was on children and geriatric abuse victims. She later worked with the Lauderdale County Welfare Department.

From 1998 to 2001, Barry taught in the Meridian Public Schools system. She then served as the Executive Director of the American Red Cross Key Chapter from 2001 until her election as mayor. The American Red Cross Key Chapter serves Clarke, Kemper, Lauderdale, Neshoba, Newton and Scott Counties in Mississippi.

Barry narrowly defeated Democratic challenger Percy Bland to become the first female mayor of Meridian, Mississippi. She won by a margin of only 293 votes.

On Tuesday, July 7, 2009, shortly after her first City Council meeting, Barry vowed to make good on a campaign promise to have the community more involved in the governing process. "What I want to do is involve this community and give ownership back to the residents of Meridian," she said. "I want their input. I want their ideas."

The mayor receives a salary of $80,000 per year, making her the fifth highest paid city employee in Meridian.

On June 4, 2013, Barry lost her bid for re-election to Percy Bland by a margin of 4,514 votes for Barry to 5,479 votes for Bland. Bland took office on July 1, 2013.

Municipal Projects

Meridian Law Enforcement Center

On November 16, 2010, Mayor Barry and the Meridian City Council approved an order that authorized the execution of amendment to agreement for professional services between Watkins Development, LLC and the City of Meridian.

On June 7, 2011, Mayor Barry and other local officials held a ground-breaking for the Meridian Law Enforcement Center.

In June 2012, after a delay in construction, Mayor Barry announced the official approval to move forward with the Meridian Law Enforcement Center, and detailed the proposed financial structure for the city project.

On March 19, 2014, Watkins Development was charged with securities fraud for transferring more than $500,000 in public funds to  the Meridian Law Enforcement Center project from the account of Retro Metro LLC, which was formed to renovate the Metrocenter Mall in Jackson, Mississippi.

On November 20, 2014, The Chancery Court of Hinds County, First Judicial District, ordered Watkins Development, LLC and David Watkins, Sr. to pay more than $650,000 in restitution, penalties, and interest for violations of the Mississippi Securities Act.

On June 28, 2016, the Mississippi Court of Appeals rendered a decision that reinstated the 2014 Secretary of State final order for the fraudulent transfer of funds to the Meridian Law Enforcement Center project.

References

Mayors of Meridian, Mississippi
Women mayors of places in Mississippi
Mississippi Republicans
University of Mississippi alumni
Living people
Year of birth missing (living people)
21st-century American women